Thomas Allan Napier Corson (25 February 1902 – 30 April 1972) was a New Zealand businessman and local politician. He was born in Napier, Hawke's Bay, New Zealand on 25 February 1902.

References

1902 births
1972 deaths
20th-century New Zealand businesspeople
20th-century New Zealand politicians